Group B of the 1999 Fed Cup Americas Zone Group II was one of two pools in the Americas Zone Group II of the 1999 Fed Cup. Four teams competed in a round robin competition, with the top two teams advancing to the knockout stage.

Cuba vs. El Salvador

Bahamas vs. Haiti

Cuba vs. Bahamas

El Salvador vs. Haiti

Cuba vs. Haiti

Bahamas vs. El Salvador

See also
Fed Cup structure

References

External links
 Fed Cup website

1999 Fed Cup Americas Zone